Jordi Sabatés Navarro (Barcelona, Spain, 23 October 1948 – Barcelona, 10 January 2022) was a Spanish pianist, composer, and arranger.

Biography
In his youth, he was a member of the folk-rock band Pic-Nic.  He later joined the progressive rock band Om. He composed also several film scores, mainly documentaries such as Bola de Nieve (2003). In 1971 he formed the group Jarka and in 1973 he began working with Toti Soler. In the late 1990s he toured with Maria del Mar Bonet and other notable Spanish artists. He died on 10 January 2022, at the age of 73.

References

External links
 Official site
 
 

1948 births
2022 deaths
21st-century male musicians
21st-century pianists
Spanish pianists
Spanish composers
Spanish male composers
Spanish film score composers
Male film score composers
People from Barcelona
Male pianists